The 1921 Utah Utes football team represented the University of Utah  as a member of the Rocky Mountain Conference (RMC) during the 1921 college football season. Led by third-year head coach Thomas M. Fitzpatrick, the Utes compiled an overall record of 3–2–1 with a mark of 2–1–1 in conference play, placing third in the RMC. On November 12, Utah hosted its first homecoming game, which ended in a scoreless tie with Colorado.

Schedule

References

Utah
Utah Utes football seasons
Utah Utes football